Dragica Basletić (30 August 1916 – 26 August 1976) was a Croatian gymnast. She competed in the women's artistic team all-around at the 1948 Summer Olympics.

References

1916 births
1976 deaths
Croatian female artistic gymnasts
Olympic gymnasts of Yugoslavia
Gymnasts at the 1948 Summer Olympics
Sportspeople from Rijeka